The Paraguay women's national under-16 and under-17 basketball team is a national basketball team of Paraguay, governed by the Confederación Paraguaya de Basquetbol.

It represents the country in international under-16 and under-17 (under age 16 and under age 17) women's basketball competitions.

It lastly appeared at the South American U17 Championship for Women.

See also
Paraguay women's national basketball team
Paraguay women's national under-19 basketball team
Paraguay men's national under-17 basketball team

References

External links
 Archived records of Paraguay team participations

Basketball in Paraguay
Basketball teams in Paraguay
Women's national under-17 basketball teams
Basketball